The 2019–20 North Superleague (known as the McBookie.com North Superleague for sponsorship reasons) was the 19th season of the North Superleague, the top tier of league competition for SJFA North Region member clubs. Banks O' Dee were the reigning champions. 

On 13 March 2020, the Scottish football season was suspended with immediate effect due to the COVID-19 pandemic.

On 1 May 2020, SJFA North Region clubs voted to declare declared the 2019–20 season null and void.

Teams and locations

The following teams changed division after the 2018–19 season.

To North Superleague
Promoted from North First Division
 Banchory St. Ternan
 Deveronside

From North Superleague
Relegated to North First Division
 Dufftown
 Stonehaven

League table at time of abandonment

The league was suspended in March 2020 and declared null and void on 1 May with no champion declared and no relegation.

Results

References

2019–20 in Scottish football leagues
SJFA North Region Superleague seasons
North Superleague